The 1975 Eastbourne Championships was a women's tennis tournament played on outdoor grass courts at Devonshire Park in Eastbourne in the United Kingdom. The event was part of the Women's International Grand Prix circuit of the 1975 WTA Tour. It was the second edition of the tournament and was held from 16 June through 21 June 1975. Fifth-seeded Virginia Wade won the singles title and earned £1,750 ($4,025) first-prize money.

Finals

Singles
 Virginia Wade defeated  Billie Jean King 7–5, 4–6, 6–3

Doubles
 Julie Anthony /  Olga Morozova defeated  Evonne Goolagong /  Peggy Michel 6–2, 6–4

References

External links
 Tournament draws

Eastbourne Championships
Eastbourne International
Eastbourne Championships
Eastbourne Championships
1975 in English women's sport